Kafr may refer to:
 A Levantine Arabic term for village
 Kafir, an Arabic term for an infidel
 Kafr, Iran, a village

See also 
 
 Kafir (disambiguation)
 Al-Kafr